This article has details on FC Hansa Rostock statistics.

Recent seasons (from 1991 onwards)

Honours
East German champions: 1991
East German vice-champions: 1955, 1962, 1963, 1964, 1968
East German Cup: 1991
East German Cup finalists: 1955, 1957, 1960, 1967, 1987
2. Bundesliga champions: 1995
German Indoor champions: 1998
German Under 17 championship runners-up: 2005

External links 
 FC Hansa Rostock on fussballdaten.de (German)
official website of FC Hansa Rostock (German)

German football club statistics